Charles Théveneau de Morande (1741–1805) was a gutter journalist, blackmailer and French spy who lived in London in the 18th century.

Bibliography 
 Hannah Barker, Simon Burrows (ed.), Press, Politics and the Public Sphere in Europe and North America, 1760-1820, Cambridge University Press, 2002.
 Simon Burrows, « A Literary Low-Life Reassessed : Charles Théveneau de Morande in London, 1769-1791 », Eighteenth-Century Life, #22, 1er février 1998, p. 76-94.
 Idem, A King's Ransom : The Life of Charles Théveneau de Morande, Blackmailer, Scandalmonger and Master-Spy, Londres, Continuum, 2010.
 Robert Darnton, Édition et sédition. L’univers de la littérature clandestine au XVIIIe, Paris, Gallimard, 1991, 278 p.
 Henri Doniol, Histoire de la participation de la France à l’établissement des États-Unis d’Amérique, Paris, 1866-1899. 6 vol.
 Frédéric Gaillardet, Mémoires du chevalier d’Éon, 2 vol., Paris, 1836
 Vivian R. Gruder, « Whither Revisionism ? Political Perspectives on the Ancien Regime », French Historical Studies, v. 20, #2, 1997, p. 245-285.
 M. de Loménie, Beaumarchais en son temps, étude sur le société en France au XVIIIe d’après des documents inédits, Paris, 1850, 2 vol.
 Didier Ozanam et Michel Antoine, Correspondance secrète du comte de Broglie et de Louis XV (1756-1774), Paris, Klincksieck, 1961 (Société de l'histoire de France), 2 vol., 1036 p.
 Gunnar et Mavis von Proschwitz, Beaumarchais et le Courier de l’Europe : documents inédits ou peu connus, documents inédits ou peu connus, Voltaire Foundation, 1990, 1289 p.
 Joseph-Marie Quérard, La France littéraire, Paris, 1827-1864, 12 vol.
 Paul Robiquet, Théveneau de Morande, étude sur le XVIIIe, Paris, A. Quantin imprimeur, 1882 Édition en ligne
 Jean Sgard (under the direction of), Dictionnaire des journalistes : 1600-1789, Voltaire foundation, 1999, 2 vol.

Sources 
 Louis Petit de Bachaumont, Mémoires secrets pour servir à l’histoire de la république des lettres en France…, 1762–69, publié par P. L. Jacob, 1874.
 Edgard Boutaric, Correspondance secrète inédite de Louis XV sur la politique étrangère avec le comte de Broglie Tercier, etc., Paris, Plon, 1866, 2 tomes.
 J.-P. Brissot, Mémoires, (1734-1793) publiés avec étude critique et notes par Claude Perroud (vol. 1).
 J.-B. Du Sault, Recueil d’anecdotes biographiques, historiques et politiques sur les personnages les plus remarquables et les événements les plus frappants de la Révolution française, Paris, 1798.
 Anne-Gédéon de La Fitte de Pelleport, Le Diable dans un Bénitier et la Métamorphose du Gazetier cuirassé en mouche, ou tentative du Sieur Receveur, Inspecteur de la Police de Paris, Chevalier de St. Louis pour établir à Londres une Police à l’Instar de celle de Paris…, Londres, 1783, 159 p.
 Pierre Manuel, La Police de Paris dévoilée..., vol.II, Paris Garnery, 1791, 2 vol, in-8.
 François Ravaisson Mollien (éd.), Archives de la Bastilles : documents inédits, A. Durand et Pedone-Lauriel, 1866-1904, vol. XV. 
 Charles Théveneau de Morande, Réplique de Charles Théveneau de Morande à J. p. Brissot : sur les erreurs et les calomnies de sa réponse… supplément de l’Argus patriote, Paris, Froullé, 1791.

External links 
 Théveneau de Morande on Wikisource
 Simon Burrows, A Literary Low-Life Reassessed: Charles Théveneau de Morande in London, 1769-1791 from Johns Hopkins University Press.
  La Gazette noire par un homme qui n'est pas blanc, ou Œuvres posthumes du Gazetier cuirassé.
 Lettres aux électeurs du département de Paris sur Jacques-Pierre Brissot, Paris, 1791.
  Réplique de Charles Théveneau Morande à Jacques-Pierre Brissot : sur les erreurs, les oublis, les infidélités, et les calomnies de sa Réponse.

1741 births
1805 deaths
18th-century French journalists
French spies